Sir George Osborn, 4th Baronet (10 May 1742 – 29 June 1818) was born into the British aristocracy. He fought in the American Revolutionary War as a British officer. He served in the House of Commons from 1769 to 1784 - before, during, and after that conflict. In 1777 he led a detachment of the Guards Brigade at the battles of Brandywine and Germantown. Besides his combat duties, he served as the inspector of the Hessian mercenary soldiers. After returning from America in 1777 he was promoted in rank to general officer. In 1787 he received advancement to lieutenant general. He is remembered in United States history for a clever but harsh comment that he made concerning the dead body of an American officer.

Early career
Born on 10 May 1742, Osborn was the oldest son of Sir Danvers Osborn, 3rd Baronet and educated at Westminster School and Trinity College, Cambridge. He succeeded to the baronetcy  and the family seat at Chicksands Priory when his father died in 1753 while governor of the Province of New York. Osborn was a cousin of Frederick North, Lord North who was Prime Minister of the United Kingdom from 1770 to 1782. He was the grandson of George Montagu, 1st Earl of Halifax and the nephew of George Montagu-Dunk, 2nd Earl of Halifax. He was also a nephew of general and playwright John Burgoyne. He served as Groom of the Bedchamber to King George III from 1770 to 1812.

He was elected on 24 April 1769 to the House of Commons for the Bossiney constituency in Cornwall. On 12 October 1774 he was elected for the Penryn constituency in Cornwall. Like his relative Lord North, Osborn held Tory political beliefs.

American Revolutionary War
During the American Revolutionary War he was captain of the grenadier company of the Guards Brigade with the rank of lieutenant colonel in the army. In addition to his other duties, he filled the post of Mustermaster-General and Inspector of the Foreign Troops. The latter responsibility required him to keep track of the strength and condition of the Hessian and other German mercenaries. The information was sent to Lord George Germain, the Secretary of State for America. For the American war, the British military establishment assembled the 1,000-man Guards Brigade by choosing the men by lottery from the 1st Foot Guards, 2nd, and 3rd Foot Guards. Brigadier General Edward Mathew commanded the unit which was split into two battalions of 500 troops each. Unlike the other regiments of foot, the light and grenadier companies of the Guards fought with their parent unit rather than being converged into elite battalions. Colonel Charles O'Hara, who later held important commands in the British army, belonged to the Guards Brigade. Among his friends, Osborn counted Lieutenant Colonel William Harcourt of the 16th Light Dragoons, Captain-lieutenant Richard FitzPatrick of the 1st Foot Guards, Lieutenant Colonel Sir John Wrottesley of the 2nd Foot Guards, and Colonel Henry Monckton of the 2nd Grenadier Battalion.

Near Raritan Landing, New Jersey on 31 May 1777, Lieutenant William Martin of Spencer's Additional Continental Regiment and a 20-man patrol were ambushed by 60 Hessian mounted and foot Jägers under Captains Richard Lorey and Carl Wreden. In the first fire, three mounted Jägers were wounded, two seriously. This infuriated the others and they set upon the Americans, killing Martin and six of his men while capturing seven more. When the Americans recovered Martin's body, it was found to be hideously mangled with seventeen sword wounds, "most of them mortal". The corpse was displayed to the American soldiers as proof of their enemies' brutality. Already irritated by incidents such as the bayoneting to death of Brigadier General Hugh Mercer at Princeton, Major General George Washington sent Martin's remains into the British lines under a flag of truce with a letter of protest. When the wagon bearing the corpse arrived at Osborn's picket post, he accepted the letter but refused the dead body. His witty but heartless reply that he, "was no coroner", was received among British officers with great amusement and even made the rounds in London.

At the Battle of Brandywine on 11 September 1777, Mathew's brigade was part of Lieutenant General Lord Charles Cornwallis' division which had reached a position on the American right rear before being detected. At 4:00 PM, the Guards Brigade took position on the right flank of the first line. Osborn commanded both the grenadier company on the right and the light company which deployed as skirmishers in front. They were opposed by the Maryland Division which was commanded by Major General John Sullivan. Since Sullivan was responsible for supervising the American right wing, he left the division under the leadership of Brigadier General Philippe Hubert Preudhomme de Borre. The Frenchman mishandled the Marylanders, throwing the division into confusion. With the Americans in disarray, the attack of the Guards easily swept them aside. At the end of the day, the entire brigade reported only one killed, five wounded, and two missing. Of these, one casualty was from Osborn's grenadiers and three from the light company. A few days after the battle Osborn and FitzPatrick caught two Guard grenadiers out plundering. The unfortunate soldiers were both sentenced to 500 lashes as punishment.

The night before the Battle of Germantown on 4 October 1777, Howe warned Osborn to expect trouble and the detached Guard grenadier and light companies took post on the far right flank next to the Queen's Rangers, a loyalist American unit. In the morning they were attacked by Brigadier General William Smallwood's Maryland militia and Brigadier General David Forman's New Jersey militia. The militia captured a few outworks but their organization soon unraveled in the face of opposition by professional soldiers. After driving back the American amateurs, the British swung to their left to flank Brigadier General Alexander McDougall's Connecticut Brigade.

On 10 November during the final part of the Siege of Fort Mifflin, Howe directed Osborn to lead an amphibious assault on the fort on Mud Island. Accordingly, he assembled his grenadier company plus an additional four officers, eight NCOs, two drummers, and 150 enlisted men from the Guards Brigade and marched to Province Island on the Delaware River. They were joined there by a detachment of light infantry, the 27th Foot and the 29th Foot. Osborn planned to load eight flatboats with 35 soldiers each for the initial assault. In the event, the American garrison evacuated the fort on the night of 15 November and Osborn's detachment occupied the place without opposition.

On 16 December 1777, Osborn and Lord Cornwallis left Philadelphia aboard the armed ship Brilliant. During his tenure as Inspector of the Foreign Troops, he cultivated excellent relations with the Hessian officer corps. Upon his arrival in England, King George promoted Osborn to brigadier general. Having obtained leave from his regiment, he then traveled in Europe.

Later career
On 30 November 1780, Osborn was elected to Parliament in a by-election, this time to the Horsham constituency in Sussex. Osborn was promoted to lieutenant general in 1787. On 1 September 1795, Prince Frederick, Duke of York and Albany wrote a report to King George III after inspecting military units in the Northern District. The report stated that Osborn commanded the 3rd Dragoon Guards, the 8th Foot, and the Durham militia at Whitburn. The 8th Foot was praised as the best line regiment in the district though its officers were not in regulation uniforms. Only 100 troopers of the 3rd Dragoon Guards were present since two squadrons had been sent to the continent. The Durham militia were well-drilled but their uniforms and equipment were in bad condition.

He was made Colonel of the 40th Regiment of Foot from 1786 to his death.

He died on 29 June 1818. He had married twice; firstly Elizabeth, the daughter and coheiress of John Bannister, with whom he had a son and secondly Lady Heneage Finch, the daughter of Daniel, 7th Earl of Winchilsea. He was succeeded by his son John.

See also
Osborn Baronets

Notes
Footnotes

Citations

References

 (Retrieved 20 November 2011)
 (Retrieved 18 November 2011)
 (Retrieved 18 November 2011)

External sources
Phillips, Michael. ageofnelson.org Ships of the Old Navy: HMS Brilliant 1757

|-

1742 births
1818 deaths
People educated at Westminster School, London
Alumni of Trinity College, Cambridge
British Army generals
British Army personnel of the American Revolutionary War
40th Regiment of Foot officers
73rd Regiment of Foot officers
Baronets in the Baronetage of England
Members of the Parliament of Great Britain for Bossiney
British MPs 1768–1774
British MPs 1774–1780
British MPs 1780–1784
Members of the Parliament of Great Britain for Penryn